The 2012 Under 21 Women's Australian Championships was a women's field hockey tournament held in the South Australian city of Adelaide, from 10–21 July.

NSW won the gold medal after defeating SA 3–1 in the final. QLD won the bronze medal by defeating the ACT 3–1 in the third place match.

Teams

 ACT
 NSW
 NT
 QLD
 SA
 TAS
 VIC
 WA

Results

Preliminary round

Fixtures

Classification round

Fifth to eighth place classification

Crossover

Seventh and eighth place

Fifth and sixth place

First to fourth place classification

Semi-finals

Third and fourth place

Final

Statistics

Final standings

Goalscorers

References

External links

2012
2012 in Australian field hockey
2012 in Australian women's field hockey
Sports competitions in Adelaide